Orthodox Church of Alexandria may refer to:
Greek Orthodox Church of Alexandria, one of the autoencephalous churches of the Eastern Orthodox Church
Coptic Orthodox Church, one of the churches that make up Oriental Orthodoxy

See also
Church of Alexandria
Patriarch of Alexandria